The Marri are a Balochi-speaking tribe of the Baloch people, who inhabit a large arid region in northeastern Balochistan, Pakistan. The Marri area is bounded to the west by the plains of Sibi. To the north are the Kakar and Loni tribes of the Pashtuns; to the east lie the lands of the Khetrans, speakers of an Indo-Aryan language, Khetrani; to the south the Bugti tribe. 

Traditionally, the Marri people, like other Baloch tribes, were nomads and earned their livelihood from grazing animals. Today, the Marri tribe is modernized, and only a few groups are left with a distinct cultural identity. Many of them hold key high positions in Pakistan both in Provincial and Federal levels of Government.

Early history and folklore 
The early history of the Marri centers around the Mir Chakar Khan, the folk hero of many Baloch romances and leader of the Rind tribe. After his quarrels with the Lasharies, and after he had been driven out of Sibi by the Arghuns, Mir Chakar took refuge in what is now the present Marri country near the Manjara River. 

Shortly after raids, the main body of the Rinds migrated to the country east of the Indus. However, a small section of the Puzh Rinds detached itself from Mir Chakar and elected to remain behind in the Sewistan Hills. The leader of this section was Bijar Khan, accompanied by Ali Khan, Mando Khan and Kalu Khan, a blacksmith (Lohar), a gardener called Kangra, and a negro (Sedi) named Shaheja. These men were the founders of the Marri tribe, which consolidated in the first quarter of the sixteenth century.

The particular spot where Bijar Khan parted ranks from Mir Chakar is known as Bijar Wad into the present day.

Constituent groups 
The Marri tribe consists of the following sections (as of 1940):
Ghazeni (which in turn is made up of the Bahawalanzai, Nozbandagani, Murgiani, Samwani, Lodhiani, Aliani, Ispani and Langhani, possibly others)
Bijarani (with subsections Tingiani, Mazarani, Kalandrani, Kaisrani, Rahmkani, Piradani-Marri, Salarani, Somrani, Kalwani, Shaheja, Powadhi and Kungrani)
 Loharani (with the three subsections of the eponymous Loharani, Mohamadani and Sherani).

See also
 Marri-Bugti Country

References

Further reading

PAK Institute for Peace Studies 19-04-2006: Baloch Insurgency – A backgrounder
Newsline Sept 2004: Edging Towards Anarchy?
New York Times April 2, 2006: In Remote Pakistan Province, a Civil War Festers

Social groups of Pakistan
Baloch tribes